Indira Gandhi University may refer to one of several universities in India:
 Indira Gandhi National Open University (IGNOU), in New Delhi
 Indira Gandhi National Tribal University, in Madhya Pradesh
 Indira Gandhi University, Rewari, in Haryana
 Indira Gandhi Agricultural University, in Raipur, Chhattisgarh (also called Indira Gandhi Krishi Vishwavidyalaya)